The Maine Girls' Academy (MGA) was an independent high school for girls located in Portland, Maine. Founded in 2016 as the successor to Catherine McAuley High School, the school was nonsectarian and not sponsored by the Sisters of Mercy, which previously sponsored Catherine McAuley High School.

History 
In the 1980s, enrollment at Catherine McAuley was close to 300, but by 2005 was approximately 200 and for the 2015–2016 school year, was just 120. In 2014, the school's future was put in jeopardy when the Sisters of Mercy announced the sale of the property, which included the high school campus and the former motherhouse of the sisters. The Catherine McCauley High School announced plans to become an independent school, and the Sisters of Mercy decided not to sponsor the new school. The school began looking for a new campus, but the developer of the motherhouse property, Sea Coast Properties, agreed to extend the school's lease, and school officials said that Catherine McAuley plans to remain on that campus for at least 25 years.

It was announced at the end of the 2015–2016 school year that Catherine McAuley High School would become an independent, nonsectarian school on 1 July 2015, effectively discontinuing ties with both the Sisters of Mercy and the Roman Catholic Church. In spring of 2016 the Sisters of Mercy told the school they could not use the name Catherine McAuley for the new school, and thus the community-wide search began for a new name. Some alumnae felt discontent with the loss of the school's name and Catholic identity, but many expressed hope for the future of the school as a nonsectarian establishment, which was partially a move to help increase enrollment. The Bishop of Portland, Robert Deeley, issued a statement afterward, writing that he was saddened by the decision, and wrote, "we regret the loss of a Catholic school in our diocese."

The six-week naming process yielded suggestions from faculty, students, parents and alumni. The more than 400 suggestions included Atlantic Academy, Coastal Maine Academy, Evergreen Academy, Baxter Woods Academy, Lionheart Academy, as well as names of prominent women from Maine and around the world. Ultimately, the naming committee decided on The Maine Girls' Academy, which they believed reflected its status as the only girls' school in the state of Maine.

On July 5, 2018, citing low enrollment that caused expenses to exceed income, the school announced it would not be re-opening for the upcoming school year.

Academics 
MGA offered eight Advanced Placement (AP) courses.

Athletics 
The Maine Girls' Academy was a member of the Southern Maine Activities Association (SMAA).

The Lions won state titles in:
Basketball (6) (2002, 2003, 2011, 2012, 2013, 2014)
Swimming (3) (2001, 2002, 2008)
Tennis (1) (2000)

External links 
 School website

References 

2016 establishments in Maine
2018 disestablishments in Maine
Defunct girls' schools in the United States
Defunct high schools in the United States
Defunct schools in Portland, Maine
Educational institutions disestablished in 2018
Educational institutions established in 2016
Former Roman Catholic church buildings
Private high schools in Maine
High schools in Cumberland County, Maine
History of women in Maine